Edgardo Enrique Fuentes Silva (born 18 August 1958) is a former Chilean professional footballer who played for Cobreloa in Chile and Puebla F.C., Club León and Atlético Morelia in the Primera División de México. Fuentes was an important part of Cobreloa's championship-winning squad during the 1992 season.

References

External links
 
 
 Edgardo Fuentes at PartidosdeLaRoja 

1958 births
Living people
Footballers from Santiago
Chilean footballers
Chilean expatriate footballers
Chile international footballers
Chilean Primera División players
Liga MX players
Club Deportivo Palestino footballers
Cruz Azul footballers
Club Puebla players
Club León footballers
Cobreloa footballers
Atlético Morelia players
Unión Española footballers
Chilean expatriate sportspeople in Mexico
Expatriate footballers in Mexico
Association football midfielders
Chilean football managers
Chilean expatriate football managers
Club León managers
Querétaro F.C. managers
Liga MX managers
Expatriate football managers in Mexico